Enrique García-Ramal Cerralbo (27 July 1914 – 30 November 1987) was a Spanish politician who served as a minister without portfolio between 1969 and 1973, during the Francoist dictatorship.

References

1914 births
1987 deaths
Government ministers during the Francoist dictatorship